Thatta Jhamb is a small village in Bhawana Tehsil located near Jhang Chiniot road, Pakistan. It's villagers are mostly the Klasan Jappa and the Chadhar.

Chiniot District
Villages in Chiniot District